FXX is an American television channel owned and operated by The Walt Disney Company.

FXX may also refer to:

FXX (Canada), Canadian TV channel
Ferrari FXX, 2000s Ferrari race car
Ferrari FXX-K, 2010s Ferrari hypercar
 Felix Airways (ICAO airline designator)
 Fokker F.XX, a Dutch airliner
 F/A-XX program (aka F-XX), a 21st-century U.S. Navy project to replace the F/A-18E/F

See also

 FX (disambiguation)
 FX2 (disambiguation)
 F20 (disambiguation)